Acta Geographica Slovenica is a peer-reviewed scientific journal of geography published by the Anton Melik Geographical Institute covering human geography, physical geography, and regional geography. The editor-in-chief is Blaž Komac (Anton Melik Geographical Institute).

It was established in 1952 as Acta Geographica/Geografski Zbornik. In 2002 it merged with Geographica Slovenica, obtaining its current title reflecting this merger in 2003.

Abstracting and indexing 
This journal is abstracted and indexed in:

According to the Journal Citation Reports, the journal has a 2019 impact factor of 1.341.

See also 
 List of academic journals published in Slovenia

References

External links 
 

Publications established in 1952
Geography journals
Multilingual journals
English-language journals
Slovene-language journals
Academic journals published by independent research institutes
Academic journals published in Slovenia
Slovenian Academy of Sciences and Arts
Triannual journals